Tributaries and sub-tributaries are hierarchically listed in order from the mouth of the Columbia River upstream. Major dams and reservoir lakes are also noted.

List of major tributaries

The main river and tributaries are (sorted in order from the mouth heading upstream):

 Wallacut River (Washington)
 Chinook River (Washington)
 Alder Creek (Oregon)
 Tansy Creek (Oregon)
 Skipanon River (Oregon)
 Youngs River (Oregon)
 Lewis and Clark River (Oregon)
 Wallooskee River (Oregon)
 Klaskanine River (Oregon)
 Frank Born Creek (Washington)
 Sisson Creek (Washington)
 Deep River (Washington)
 Grays River (Washington)
 Crooked Creek (Washington)
 Elochoman River (Washington)
 John Day River (Oregon)
 Eskeline Creek (Oregon)
 Hillcrest Creek (Oregon)
 Big Creek (Oregon)
 Little Creek (Oregon)
 Gnat Creek (Oregon)
 Kelly Creek (Oregon)
 Spear Creek (Oregon)
 Hunt Creek (Oregon)
 Driscoll Slough (Oregon)
 Westport Slough (Oregon)
 Plympton Creek (Oregon)
 West Creek (Oregon)
 Ross Creek (Oregon)
 Olsen Creek (Oregon)
 Eilertsen Creek (Oregon)
 OK Creek (Oregon)
 Favorite Creek (Oregon)
 Tandy Creek (Oregon)
 Graham Creek (Oregon)
 Clatskanie River (Oregon)
 Fall Creek (Oregon)
 Merril Creek (Oregon)
 Perkins Creek (Oregon)
 Coal Creek Slough (Washington)
 Cougar Creek (Washington)
 Abe Creek (Washington)
 Mill Creek (Washington)
 Abernathy Creek (Washington)
 Germany Creek (Washington)
 Coal Creek Slough (Washington)
 Cowlitz River (Washington)
 Coweeman River (Washington)
 Toutle River (Washington)
 Mayfield Dam and Lake Mayfield (Washington)
 Tilton River (Washington)
 Mossyrock Dam and Riffe Lake (Washington)
 Cowlitz Falls Dam and Lake Scanewa (Washington)
 Cispus River (Washington)
 Muddy Fork (Washington)
 Clear Fork (Washington)
 Ohanapecosh River (Washington)
 Kalama River (Washington)
 Lewis River (Washington)
 East Fork Lewis River (Washington)
 Merwin Dam and Lake Merwin (Washington)
 Yale Dam and Yale Lake (Washington)
 Swift Dam and Swift Reservoir (Washington)
 Lake River (Washington)
 Buckmire Slough (Washington)
 Salmon Creek (Washington)
 Whipple Creek (Washington)
 Flume Creek (Washington)
 Bachelor Island Slough (Washington)
 Willamette River (Oregon; see below for sub-tributaries)
 Washougal River (Washington)
 Sandy River (Oregon)
 Bull Run River
 Little Sandy River
 Salmon River (Oregon)
 Zigzag River (Oregon)
 Gibbons Creek (Washington)
 Crusher Creek (Oregon)
 Rainbow Creek (Oregon)
 Lawton Creek (Washington)
 Latourell Creek (Oregon)
 Young Creek (Oregon)
 Bridal Veil Creek (Oregon)
 Coopey Creek (Oregon)
 Dalton Creek (Oregon)
 Mist Creek (Oregon)
 Wahkeena Creek (Oregon)
 Multnomah Creek (Oregon)
 Shady Creek
 Big John Creek
 Good Bear Creek (Washington)
 Archer Creek (Washington)
 Indian Mary Creek (Washington)
 Oneonta Creek (Oregon)
 Bell Creek
 Horsetail Creek (Oregon)
 Duncan Creek (Washington)
 Tumalt Creek (Oregon)
 Woodard Creek (Washington)
 Hardy Creek (Washington)
 McCord Creek (Oregon)
 Hamilton Creek (Washington)
 Metasequoia Creek (Oregon)
 Moffett Creek (Oregon)
 Tanner Creek (Oregon)
 Bonneville Dam and Lake Bonneville (Washington, Oregon)
 Eagle Creek (Oregon)
 Sorenson Creek
 Tish Creek
 Opal Creek (Oregon)
 Ruckel Creek (Oregon)
 Rudolph Creek (Oregon)
 Dry Creek (Oregon)
 Rock Creek (Washington)
 Kanaka Creek (Washington)
 Herman Creek (Oregon)
 Little Herman Creek
 Camp Creek
 Casey Creek
 Hazel Creek
 Slide Creek
 Mullinix Creek
 Whisky Creek
 Nelson Creek (Washington)
 Carson Creek (Washington)
 Grays Creek (Oregon)
 Wind River (Washington)
 Gorton Creek (Oregon)
 Harphan Creek (Oregon)
 Summit Creek (Oregon)
 Collins Creek (Washington)
 Lindsey Creek (Oregon)
 Wonder Creek (Oregon)
 Warren Creek (Oregon)
 Cabin Creek (Oregon)
 Starvation Creek (Oregon)
 Dog Creek (Washington)
 Viento Creek (Oregon)
 Perham Creek (Oregon)
 Little White Salmon River (Washington)
 Phelps Creek (Oregon)
 Flume Creek
 White Salmon River (Washington)
 Henderson Creek (Oregon)
 Hood River (Oregon)
 Dry Creek (Washington)
 Jewett Creek (Washington)
 Mosier Creek (Oregon)
 Catherine Creek (Washington)
 Major Creek (Washington)
 Rowena Creek (Oregon)
 Klickitat River (Washington)
 Gooseberry Creek (Oregon)
 Chenoweth Creek (Oregon)
 Mill Creek (Oregon)
 Fifteenmile Creek (Oregon)
 Eightmile Creek
 Ramsey Creek
 The Dalles Dam and Lake Celilo (Washington, Oregon)
 Deschutes River (Oregon)
 White River (Oregon)
 Warm Springs River (Oregon)
 Round Butte Dam and Lake Billy Chinook (Oregon)
 Crooked River (Oregon)
 Arthur R. Bowman Dam and Prineville Reservoir (Oregon)
 Metolius River (Oregon)
 Whychus Creek (Oregon)
 Tumalo Creek (Oregon)
 Spring River (Oregon)
 Little Deschutes River (Oregon)
 Fall River (Oregon)
 Cultus River (Oregon)
 Snow Creek (Oregon)
 John Day Dam and Lake Umatilla (Washington, Oregon)
 John Day River (Oregon)
 Willow Creek (Oregon)
 Rhea Creek
 Hinton Creek
 Umatilla River (Oregon)
 McNary Dam and Lake Wallula (Washington, Oregon)
 Walla Walla River (Washington, Oregon)
 Touchet River (Washington)
 Snake River (Washington, Oregon, Idaho, Wyoming; see below for sub-tributaries)
 Yakima River (Washington; see below for sub-tributaries)
 Priest Rapids Dam (Washington) and Priest Rapids Lake (Washington)
 Crab Creek (Washington)
 Wanapum Dam (Washington) and Lake Wanapum (Washington)
 Rock Island Dam (Washington) and Rock Island Pool (Washington)
 Wenatchee River (Washington)
 Chiwawa River (Washington)
 Lake Wenatchee
 Little Wenatchee River
 White River
 Napeequa River
 Rocky Reach Dam and Lake Entiat (Washington)
 Entiat River (Washington)
 Mad River (Washington)
 Chelan River (and Lake Chelan) (Washington)
 Stehekin River (Washington)
 Wells Dam and Lake Pateros (Washington)
 Methow River (Washington)
 Twisp River (Washington)
 Okanogan River (Washington, British Columbia)
 Similkameen River (British Columbia, Washington)
 Tulameen River (British Columbia)
 Pasayten River (British Columbia, Washington)
 Okanagan Lake (British Columbia)
 Chief Joseph Dam and Rufus Woods Lake (Washington)
 Nespelem River (Washington)
 Grand Coulee Dam and Franklin D. Roosevelt Lake (Washington)
 Sanpoil River (Washington)
 Spokane River (Washington, Idaho)
 Spokane Falls (Washington)
 Little Spokane River (Washington)
 Latah Creek (Washington and Idaho)
 Lake Coeur d'Alene (Idaho)
 Coeur d'Alene River (Idaho)
 Saint Joe River (Idaho)
 Saint Maries River (Idaho)
 Colville River (Washington)
 Martin Creek (Washington) 
 South Fork Roper Creek (Washington) 
 Sherman Creek (Washington) 
 Nancy Creek (Washington) 
 Katy Creek (Washington) 
 Kettle River (Washington, British Columbia)
 Granby River (British Columbia)
 West Kettle River (British Columbia)
 Pend Oreille River (British Columbia, Washington, Idaho; see below for sub-tributaries)
 Kootenay River (British Columbia, Idaho, Montana; see below for sub-tributaries)
 Hugh Keenleyside Dam and Arrow Lakes (British Columbia)
 Whatshan River (British Columbia)
 Whatshan Dam (British Columbia)
 Beaton Creek (British Columbia)
 Incomappleux River (British Columbia)
 Illecillewaet River (British Columbia)
 Revelstoke Dam and Revelstoke Lake (British Columbia)
 Goldstream River (British Columbia)
 Mica Dam and Kinbasket Lake (British Columbia)
 Canoe River (British Columbia)
 Wood River (British Columbia)
 Bush River (British Columbia)
 Valenciennes River (British Columbia)
 Blaeberry River (British Columbia)
 Beaver River (British Columbia)
 Kicking Horse River (British Columbia)
 Yoho River (British Columbia)
 Spillimacheen River (British Columbia)
 Templeton River
 Columbia Lake (British Columbia)

Willamette River system 
 Columbia Slough
 Multnomah Channel
 Milton Creek
 Stephens Creek
 Johnson Creek
 Crystal Springs Creek
 Kellogg Creek
 Tryon Creek
 Oswego Creek and Oswego Lake
 Clackamas River
 Collawash River
 Tualatin River
 Fanno Creek
 Molalla River
 Pudding River
 Yamhill River
 North Yamhill River
 South Yamhill River
 Luckiamute River
 Santiam River
 North Santiam River
 Detroit Dam and Detroit Lake
 Breitenbush River
 South Santiam River
 Middle Santiam River
 Calapooia River
 Marys River
 Long Tom River
 McKenzie River 
 Mohawk River
 Cougar Dam and Cougar Reservoir
 Coast Fork Willamette River
 Big River
 Middle Fork Willamette River
 Lookout Point Dam and Lookout Point Lake
 North Fork Middle Fork Willamette River

Snake River system 
 Ice Harbor Dam and Lake Sacajawea (Washington)
 Lower Monumental Dam and Lake Herbert G. West (Washington)
 Palouse River (Washington, Idaho)
 Tucannon River (Washington)
 Little Goose Dam and Lake Bryan (Washington)
 Lower Granite Dam (Washington)
 Clearwater River (Idaho)
 Potlatch River (Idaho)
 North Fork Clearwater River (Idaho)
 Middle Fork Clearwater River (Idaho)
 South Fork Clearwater River (Idaho)
 Grande Ronde River (Washington, Oregon)
 Wallowa River (Oregon)
 Lostine River (Oregon)
 Minam River (Oregon)
 Salmon River (Idaho)
 Imnaha River (Oregon)
 Hells Canyon Dam (Idaho, Oregon)
 Oxbow Dam (Idaho, Oregon)
 Brownlee Dam (Idaho, Oregon)
 Powder River (Oregon)
 Weiser River (Idaho)
 Burnt River (Oregon)
 Payette River (Idaho)
 Malheur River (Oregon)
 Owyhee River (Oregon, Idaho, Nevada)
 Owyhee Dam and Owyhee Reservoir (Oregon)
 Boise River (Idaho)
 Lucky Peak Dam and Lucky Peak Lake (Idaho)
 Arrowrock Dam and Arrowrock Reservoir (Idaho)
 Anderson Ranch Dam and Anderson Ranch Reservoir (Idaho)
 Swan Falls Dam (Idaho)
 C. J. Strike Dam (Idaho)
 Bruneau River (Idaho)
 Bliss Dam (Idaho)
 Malad River (Idaho)
 Lower Salmon Dam (Idaho)
 Upper Salmon Dam (Idaho)
 Salmon Falls Creek (Idaho and Nevada)
 Shoshone Falls (Idaho)
 Milner Dam (Idaho)
 Minidoka Dam and Lake Walcott (Idaho)
 Raft River (Idaho, Utah)
 American Falls Dam (Idaho)
 Portneuf River (Idaho)
 Blackfoot River (Idaho)
 Gem State Dam (Idaho)
 Henrys Fork (Idaho)
 Teton River (Idaho)
 Palisades Dam (Idaho)
 Salt River (Wyoming)
 Greys River (Wyoming)
 Gros Ventre River (Wyoming)
 Jackson Lake Dam and Jackson Lake (Wyoming)
 "Closed basin" rivers that drain to the Snake underground:
 Big Lost River (Idaho)
 Little Lost River (Idaho)

Yakima River system 
 Amon Creek (Washington)
 Naches River (Washington)
 Tieton River (Washington)
 Tieton Dam and Rimrock Lake (Washington)
 Bumping River (Washington)
 American River (Washington)
 Wenas Creek (Washington)
 Selah Creek (Washington)
 Teanaway River (Washington)
 Cle Elum River (Washington)
 Kachess River (Washington)
 Kachess Lake (Washington)
 Keechelus Lake (Washington)

Pend Oreille River system 
 Waneta Dam (British Columbia)
 Seven Mile Dam (British Columbia)
 Salmo River (British Columbia)
 Boundary Dam (Washington)
 Box Canyon Dam (Washington) (Washington)
 Albeni Falls Dam (Idaho)
 Priest River (Idaho)
 Lake Pend Oreille (Idaho)
 Pack River (Idaho)
 Clark Fork (Idaho, Montana)
 Cabinet Gorge Dam (Idaho)
 Noxon Rapids Dam (Montana)
 Thompson River (Montana)
 Little Thompson River (Montana)
 Vermilion River (Montana)
 Flathead River (Montana, British Columbia)
 Jocko River (Montana)
 Kerr Dam (Montana)
 Flathead Lake (Montana)
 Swan River (Montana)
 Whitefish River (Montana)
Stillwater River (Montana)
 South Fork Flathead River (Montana)
 Hungry Horse Dam (Montana)
 North Fork Flathead River (Montana, British Columbia)
 Bitterroot River (Montana)
 Blackfoot River (Montana)
 Little Blackfoot River (Montana)

Kootenay River system 
 Brilliant Dam (British Columbia)
 Slocan River (British Columbia)
 Little Slocan River
 Slocan Lake
 Corra Linn Dam (British Columbia)
 Kootenay Lake (British Columbia)
 Duncan River (British Columbia)
 Duncan Dam (British Columbia)
 Goat River (British Columbia)
 Moyie River (Idaho, British Columbia)
 Yaak River (Montana, Yahk River in British Columbia)
 Fisher River (Montana)
 Libby Dam (Montana) and Lake Koocanusa (Montana, British Columbia)
 Elk River (British Columbia)
 Wigwam River (British Columbia, Montana)
 Coal Creek (British Columbia)
 Fording River (British Columbia)
 Bull River (British Columbia)
 Wild Horse River (British Columbia)
 St. Mary River (British Columbia)
 Lussier River (British Columbia)
 Palliser River (British Columbia)
 Cross River (British Columbia)
 Vermilion River (British Columbia)

See also 
 List of British Columbia rivers
 List of Idaho rivers
 List of Montana rivers
 List of Oregon rivers
 List of Washington rivers
 List of rivers of the Americas

References

 
Columbia
Tributaries of the Columbia
International rivers of North America
Tributaries of the Columbia
Columbia River tributaries
Columbia